Edward Simons Fulmer (16 April 1919 – 31 December 2017) was an officer and pilot of the United States Army Air Forces. At the time of his death Fulmer was one of the only four living knights of the very exclusive Military Order of William, the highest honour of the Kingdom of the Netherlands.

Biography 
Born on 16 April 1919 in East Syracuse, Fulmer has been a lifelong resident of the area. 

During World War II second lieutenant Fulmer served as a pilot of the United States Army Air Forces with the 43d Troop Carrier Squadron, 315th Troop Carrier Group, 9th Air Force. 

On 18 September 1944, during the battles of the 82nd Airborne Division in Operation Market Garden, he was the second pilot on a Douglas C-47 Skytrain, carrying an entire unit of British parachute troops and an amount of explosive substances, planned to descend with gliders to the area around Ede. Over ’s-Hertogenbosch the airplane was heavily damaged by defensive fire from the Wehrmacht, which caused the pilot to lose consciousness and produced a heavy fire on board. Taking over control of the aircraft, Fulmer made sure the troops and the rest of the crew could save themselves by parachute. In the meantime he suffered serious burns to the face, neck, back, and arms. Nonetheless, he managed to crash land the airplane in an heroic attempt to also save the life of the unconscious pilot. Upon landing, the plane burst into uncontrollable flames and Fulmer was able to escape through a side window. He was then taken care of by Dutch resistance fighters.

After the war, he was awarded the Distinguished Service Cross in 1945. 

In 1946 Fulmer was knighted by Queen Wilhelmina of the Netherlands, receiving the fourth class knighthood in the Military Order of William (RMWO). This order is the highest and oldest order of chivalry of the Kingdom of the Netherlands, bestowed for "performing excellent acts of bravery, leadership and loyalty in battle".

Fulmer and his wife  of 73 years, Lucille White Fulmer had three children: Edward, Randy and Linda.

He died at the VA Hospital in Syracuse, New York on 31 December 2017 at the age of 98.

Airmen of the Royal Netherlands Air Force kept watch during a vigil and the commemoration ceremony was attended by Major Gijs Tuinman RMWO, the Dutch Ambassador to the United States and the chairman of the Chancellery of the Orders of the Netherlands, Major-General (Ret) Henk Morsink. On this occasion, Morsink said:  "I had the honor to meet him three times in recent years, and I would like to repeat the words of General Patton: We should not cry for the loss of this man, but we may thank God for the honor and privilege of this great man, Edward Simons Fulmer. We will never forget Ed."

Honors and awards

Badges and awards

Military Order of William citation 
By royal decree No. 26 of 17 October 1946: knight 4th class in the Military Order of William for:

Distinguished Service Cross citation 
By General Orders No. 21 (1945) of the Headquarters, U.S. Strategic Forces in Europe:

Literature

References

1919 births
2017 deaths
Knights Fourth Class of the Military Order of William
People from DeWitt, New York
Military personnel from Syracuse, New York
Recipients of the Distinguished Service Cross (United States)
Recipients of the Air Medal
United States Army Air Forces pilots of World War II
Shot-down aviators
United States Army Air Forces officers